Group B of the Adriatic League took place between 4 October 2017 and it will end on 20 December 2017.

The four best ranked teams advanced to the League 8.

Standings

Fixtures and results
All times given below are in Central European Time (for the matches played in Bulgaria is time expressed in Eastern European Time).

Game 1

Game 2

Game 3

Game 4

Game 5

Game 6

Game 7

Game 8

Game 9

Game 10

References

External links
Official website

Group B